Cody Nelson (born 13 November 1988) is an Australian professional rugby league footballer who plays for the Blacktown Workers Sea Eagles in the Intrust Super Premiership NSW. He previously played for the Gold Coast Titans.

Background
Born in Mullumbimby, New South Wales, Nelson played his junior football for the Mullumbimby Giants, before being signed by the Gold Coast Titans.

Playing career

Early career
In 2008, Nelson played for the Gold Coast Titans' NYC team, before moving on to the Titans' Queensland Cup team, Tweed Heads Seagulls in 2009.

2014
In Round 8 of the 2014 NRL season, Nelson made his NRL debut for the Titans against the Wests Tigers. On 4 September 2014, he signed a 2-year contract with the Parramatta Eels starting in 2015.

2015
In Round 16 of the 2015 NRL season, Nelson made his Eels debut against the St. George Illawarra Dragons.

2018
For the 2018 season, Nelson signed a contract to join Intrust Super Premiership NSW side The Blacktown Workers Sea Eagles.

Suspension
In 2014, Nelson received a two-match suspension from the NRL after being found to have placed bets on NRL matches.

References

External links
2015 Parramatta Eels profile

1988 births
Living people
Australian rugby league players
Gold Coast Titans players
Parramatta Eels players
Rugby league hookers
Rugby league players from New South Wales
Rugby league second-rows
Tweed Heads Seagulls players
Wentworthville Magpies players